Chrysanthos Mentis Bostantzoglou (Constantinople 1918 – 13 December 1995) and better known under the pen name of Bost (Μποστ), was a prolific Greek political cartoonist, playwright, lyricist and painter.

His satirical cartoons and caricatures appeared in many papers such as I Avgi, Tachydromos and Eleftherotypia. Their radical political character (he stood unsuccessfully for election for left-wing parties on several occasions) led to a number of lawsuits.

Works
1944: "St Fanourios. Help through an understanding of the Chinese classics Gah-Chu and Wu-Svou-Ni"

1953: "Constantine Paleologos"

1959: "Sketches by Bost" (also published by Kastaniotis 1996 )

1960: "My album"

1961: "Sketches and writings (First selection)"

1961: "The profession of my mother"

1963: "Don Quixote" (play)

1963: "Beautiful city" (play)

1964: "Fausta" (play)

1993: "Medea" (play)

1995: "Romeo and Juliet" (play)

1972: "Sketches and writings (Second selection)"  (also published by Kastaniotis 1996 )

1982: "Maria Pentagiotissa" (play)

1987: "40 years of Bost" (play)

1996: "Sketches 1973-4", publisher Kastaniotis 1996 

1996: "Alilografeia me ton Kosta", publisher Nefeli 

1998: "Short stories 1960-1965", publisher Hermes

References

Bibliography
 "Bost", by Lalas, Thanasis, publisher Kastaniotis 1996 
 Kaggelaris, N. (2016), "Sophocles' Oedipus in Mentis Bostantzoglou's Medea" [in Greek] in Mastrapas, A. N. - Stergioulis, M. M. (eds.)  Seminar 42: Sophocles the great classic of tragedy , Athens: Koralli, pp. 74– 81 .
Kaggelaris, N. (2017), "Euripides in Mentis Bostantzoglou's Medea", [in Greek] Carpe Diem 2: 379-417 .

External links 
 Paintings by Bost
 Biography (Greek)
 Writings of Bost at the Centre for Neohellenic Studies (Greek)

1918 births
1995 deaths
Artists from Istanbul
Turkish people of Greek descent
Greek painters
20th-century Greek dramatists and playwrights
Constantinopolitan Greeks
Turkish emigrants to Greece
Artists from Athens
Musicians from Istanbul
Writers from Istanbul